Pulkit Narang (born 18 June 1994) is an Indian cricketer who played for Delhi. He made his first-class debut on 30 October in the 2015–16 Ranji Trophy. He made his List A debut on 25 September 2019, for Services in the 2019–20 Vijay Hazare Trophy. He made his Twenty20 debut on 9 November 2019, for Services in the 2019–20 Syed Mushtaq Ali Trophy.

References

External links
 

1994 births
Living people
Indian cricketers
Delhi cricketers
Services cricketers
Place of birth missing (living people)